Žabjek is a small settlement in the Municipality of Trebnje in eastern Slovenia. It lies north of Velika Loka. The area is part of the traditional region of Lower Carniola. The municipality is now included in the Southeast Slovenia Statistical Region.

References

External links
Žabjek at Geopedia

Populated places in the Municipality of Trebnje